Grant Fellows (April 13, 1865 – July 16, 1929) was an American jurist.

Born in Hudson Township, Lenawee County, Michigan, Fellows went to Hudson High School in Hudson, Michigan. Fellows studied law and was admitted to the Michigan bar in 1886. He practiced law. In 1913, Fellows served as Michigan Attorney General and was a Republican. From 1917 until his death in 1929, Fellows served on the Michigan Supreme Court and was the chief justice in 1922. Fellows died in a hospital in Lansing, Michigan.

Notes

1865 births
1929 deaths
People from Hudson, Michigan
Michigan lawyers
Michigan Republicans
Michigan Attorneys General
Chief Justices of the Michigan Supreme Court
19th-century American lawyers
Justices of the Michigan Supreme Court